Gé Dekker (10 December 1904 – 18 March 1995) was a Dutch swimmer. He competed in two events at the 1924 Summer Olympics, the 100 metre freestyle and the 4 × 200 metre freestyle relay.

References

External links
 

1904 births
1995 deaths
Olympic swimmers of the Netherlands
Swimmers at the 1924 Summer Olympics
Sportspeople from Zaanstad
Dutch male freestyle swimmers